Buffalo Mop is a small unincorporated community in Limestone County, Texas, United States.

References 

Unincorporated communities in Texas
Unincorporated communities in Limestone County, Texas
Ghost towns in East Texas